Riceland can refer to:
Riceland Foods, the world's largest miller and marketer of rice
Riceland Township, Minnesota